Jere Eugene Burns II (born October 15, 1954) is an American actor who has appeared in theatre productions and on television. He played the roles of ladies' man Kirk Morris on the television series Dear John, DIA psychiatrist Anson Fullerton on the television series Burn Notice, Jack on the sitcom Something So Right', and Dixie Mafia middle-man Wynn Duffy on Justified.

Early life
Jere Eugene Burns II was born in Cambridge, Massachusetts, the son of a gown and cap manufacturer. Burns was drawn to acting late in college. After graduating from the University of Massachusetts Amherst in 1980, he moved to Manhattan and was cast in the title role in Don Juan at the New York Shakespeare Festival.

Career
Burns has appeared on Broadway; his Broadway theatre credits include Hairspray and After the Night and the Music.

Burns made his television debut in a small role on ABC's ABC Afterschool Special episode "Mom's on Strike" in 1984. He had a recurring role as rapist James Fitzsimmons on Hill Street Blues and body collector Breughel on Max Headroom. In 1988 he landed the role of sleazy Kirk Morris on Dear John. In 1989 he appeared in the William Lustig film Hit List as Jared Riley.  He appeared as the villainous Cade Dalton on the NBC miniseries The Gambler Returns: The Luck of the Draw (1991), hateful Vice President of Sales Pete Schmidt on Bob (1993), a member of the feuding family in Greedy (1994), Jack Farrell in Something So Right (1996), and Ben Stuart in Life-Size (2000). He portrayed the title character's brother in "The Trouble with Harry", an episode of the series Twice in a Lifetime directed by David Winning (2000); Frank Alfonse on Good Morning, Miami (2002); Keith on The King of Queens (2006); Michael on Help Me Help You (2006); Dr. Jim on Surviving Suburbia (2007); Derek Ford on Psych, Bosco on Grey's Anatomy (2013); and Jacob Tiernan on Lucifer (2019). He starred as an FBI agent in the movie Otis (2008). Other screen credits include Crocodile Dundee in Los Angeles (2001).

In 2010, he appeared in AMC's series Breaking Bad as the group leader for a Narcotics Anonymous meeting as a part of a twelve-step program, which main character Jesse Pinkman attended. He also had a recurring role on FX's Justified as Wynn Duffy, a sadistic lieutenant in the Dixie Mafia, and appeared as villain Anson Fullerton in Seasons 5 and 6 (2011–2012) of Burn Notice on USA Network.

Burns had a recurring role as Jake Abernathy on the A&E series Bates Motel in 2013, and appeared as Lieutenant Atkins in the TBS series Angie Tribeca.

Personal life
In 1982, Burns was married to Melissa Keeler. After 14 years of marriage, they filed for divorce in 1996. The following year in 1997, he married actress Kathleen Kinmont, and they divorced in 1999. In 2008, he was married to Leslie Cohen. They later divorced in 2018 after ten years of marriage. 

He has four children.

Filmography

Film

Television

References

External links

1954 births
20th-century American male actors
21st-century American male actors
Male actors from Cambridge, Massachusetts
American male film actors
American male stage actors
American male television actors
American male voice actors
Living people
University of Massachusetts Amherst alumni